Supernova is the debut studio album by American band Today Is the Day, released in April 1993 by Amphetamine Reptile Records. In 2008, a remastered version of the album, including tracks from the band's "I Bent Scared" 7" single, was released via Steve Austin's self run SuperNova Records. A music video was produced for the track "6 Dementia Satyr".

Reception

Since its initial release in 1993, Supernova has been awarded with praise from critics for its style and musicianship. Patrick Kennedy of Allmusic awarded it 4 and a half out of 5 stars, hailing it as a "landmark recording" that "indicates that metal could indeed be far more than a simple, formulaic system of chugging riffs, screamed vocals, and stampeding drums." Last Rites' Andrew Edmunds called the album "an essential purchase" and mentioned how the band "would lay the groundwork for a seemingly never-ending wave of spastic metal bands" in his review for the 2008 edition of the album.

In an interview with the Lords of Metal fanzine, Steve Austin showed much satisfaction with older Today Is the Day work, mentioning how both Supernova and its successor Willpower are "the most fucked up albums that have ever been on planet Earth" and even suggested that the album played a key role in the development of heavy metal music, citing that artists such as The Dillinger Escape Plan and Botch were influenced by the sound of Today Is the Day. Deadguy drummer Dave Rosenberg, who was briefly a member of Today Is the Day in 1996, described Supernova as one of his favorite albums of all time.

Track listing

Personnel
Adapted from the Supernova liner notes.

Today Is the Day
Steve Austin – vocals, guitar
Mike Herrell – bass guitar
Brad Elrod – drums

Production
Tim Mac – production

Release history

References

External links 
 
 Supernova at Bandcamp

1993 albums
Today Is the Day albums
Amphetamine Reptile Records albums